The 2007–08 season was the 108th season in Società Sportiva Lazio's history and their 20th consecutive season in the top-flight of Italian football.

On 11 November 2007, a Lazio supporter, Gabriele Sandri was fatally wounded in an argument between Lazio and Juventus supporters, resulting in the police intervening and ultimately killing Sandri, who was not directly involved with the quarrel.

Club

Management

Other information

Squad

First team
As of 2008-02-08

Double passports
  Fernando Muslera
  Igli Tare
  Mourad Meghni
  Emílson Cribari
  Christian Manfredini
  Valon Behrami

Non-EU players
  Aleksandar Kolarov
  Cristian Ledesma
  Goran Pandev

Competitions

Serie A

League table

Matches

Coppa Italia

Top scorers
  Tommaso Rocchi – 14 (3)
  Goran Pandev – 14 (1)
  Rolando Bianchi – 4 (1)
  Cristian Ledesma – 3

Champions League

Third qualifying round

Lazio–Dinamo București 1-1
 0-1 Ionel Dănciulescu (22)
 1-1 Massimo Mutarelli (54)
Dinamo București–Lazio 1-3
 1-0 Florin Bratu (27)
 1-1 Tommaso Rocchi (47 pen)
 1-2 Goran Pandev (53)
 1-3 Tommaso Rocchi (66)

Group stage

Olympiacos–Lazio 1-1
 1-0 Luciano Galletti (65)
 1-1 Luciano Zauri (77)
Lazio–Real Madrid 2-2
 0-1 Ruud van Nistelrooy (8)
 1-1 Goran Pandev (32)
 1-2 Ruud van Nistelrooy (61)
 2-2 Goran Pandev (75)
Werder Bremen–Lazio 2-1
 1-0 Boubacar Sanogo (28)
 2-0 Hugo Almeida (54)
 2-1 Christian Manfredini (82)
Lazio–Werder Bremen 2-1
 1-0 Tommaso Rocchi (57)
 2-0 Tommaso Rocchi (68)
 2-1 Diego (88 pen.)
Lazio–Olympiacos 1-2
 1-0 Goran Pandev (30)
 1-1 Luciano Galletti (35)
 1-2 Darko Kovačević (64)
Real Madrid–Lazio 3-1
 1-0 Júlio Baptista (13)
 2-0 Raúl (15)
 3-0 Robinho (36)
 3-1 Goran Pandev (80)

References
General

Specific

S.S. Lazio seasons
Lazio